High affinity cAMP-specific and IBMX-insensitive 3',5'-cyclic phosphodiesterase 8A is an enzyme that in humans is encoded by the PDE8A gene. Work by Sebastiaan Bol et al. showed that 5 different transcript variants and their corresponding isoforms are expressed in human macrophages, and suggests that this protein may be required by HIV-1 for its replication.

References

Further reading

PAS-domain-containing proteins